Events in the year 1838 in Chile.

Incumbents
President: José Joaquín Prieto

Events
January 12–13: War of the Confederation: Battle of Islay

Births
March 5 - Orozimbo Barbosa (d. 1891)

References